The Second Siege of Bristol of the First English Civil War lasted from 23 August 1645 until 10 September 1645, when the Royalist commander Prince Rupert surrendered the city that he had captured from the Parliamentarians on 26 July 1643. The commander of the Parliamentarian New Model Army forces besieging Bristol was Lord Fairfax.

Prelude
After reducing Bridgwater  Fairfax and the New Model Army turned back to clear away the Dorsetshire Clubmen and besiege Sherborne Castle. On the completion of this task, it was  decided to besiege Bristol.

Siege
On 23 August 1645 the New Model Army invested Bristol. On the night of 9/10 September, Fairfax's army stormed Bristol. Prince Rupert had long realised the hopelessness of further fighting. The lines of defence around the place were too extensive for Prince Rupert's small force and on 10 September he surrendered Bristol on terms. Prince Rupert was escorted to Oxford with his men, conversing as he rode with the officers of the escort about peace and the future of his adopted country.

Aftermath
King Charles, almost stunned by the suddenness of the catastrophic loss of Bristol, dismissed Rupert from all his offices and ordered him to leave England. The fall of Bristol meant that Chester was the only important seaport remaining to connect the English Royalists with Ireland.

Citations

References
Attribution

1645 in England
Bristol
Military history of Bristol
Conflicts in 1645
17th century in Bristol